L45 may refer to:
 the Bakersfield Municipal Airport FAA LID
 Lactobacillus sakei L45, a strain of the bacterium Lactobacillus sakei